Jonas Valentin Bager (born 18 July 1996) is a Danish professional footballer who plays as a centre-back for Belgian First Division A club Sporting Charleroi.

Club career

Randers
Bager is a product of Randers FC's youth academy. In winter 2015 Bager went on a training camp with the first team squad to Spain.

He made his first team debut on 9 July 2015 against Andorran club UE Sant Julià in the UEFA Europa League qualifiers; Randers won 3–0. He came on the pitch in the 76th minute, where he replaced Johnny Thomsen. Later in the same season, Bager also made his debut in the Danish Superliga against FC Nordsjælland on 28 November 2015.

He was officially promoted to the first team in October 2015. Bager's contract was extended in September 2016 until 2020.

Union SG
In May 2019, Bager signed a three-year contract with Belgian First Division B club Union Saint-Gilloise. He made his debut for the club on 10 August as a substitute in stoppage time for Teddy Teuma in a 1–0 away win over Virton. During his first season at the club, he was mostly a substitute, making 8 total appearances.

In his second season Bager played more, and he scored his first goal for the club on 25 October 2020 in a 6–0 win over Club NXT. As he finished the season with 22 appearances, in which he scored 2 goals – both against Club NXT – Union Saint-Gilloise managed to win promotion to the Belgian First Division A as champions.

On 25 July 2021, Bager made his debut in the Belgian First Division A as a starter, providing an assist for Jean Thierry Lazare in a 3–1 away win over Anderlecht.

Sporting Charleroi
Bager joined Sporting Charleroi on 13 July 2022, signing a two-year contract with an option for an additional two years. He made his competitive debut for the club on 23 July, the first matchday of the season, coming on as a substitute in the 87th minute for Stefan Knezevic in a 3–1 home win.

International career
He has represented Denmark at youth international level from under-16 to under-21.

Career statistics

Honours
Union Saint-Gilloise
Belgian First Division B: 2020–21

References

1996 births
Living people
Danish men's footballers
Denmark youth international footballers
Denmark under-21 international footballers
Danish Superliga players
Challenger Pro League players
Belgian Pro League players
Association football defenders
People from Hadsten
Randers FC players
Royale Union Saint-Gilloise players
R. Charleroi S.C. players
Danish expatriate men's footballers
Danish expatriate sportspeople in Belgium
Expatriate footballers in Belgium
Sportspeople from the Central Denmark Region